The Radishchevo constituency (No.188) is a Russian legislative constituency in Ulyanovsk Oblast. In 1995-2007 the constituency covered upstate Ulyanovsk Oblast, however, in 2016 the constituency took parts of Ulyanovsk from Ulyanovsk constituency.

Members elected

Election results

1993

|-
! colspan=2 style="background-color:#E9E9E9;text-align:left;vertical-align:top;" |Candidate
! style="background-color:#E9E9E9;text-align:left;vertical-align:top;" |Party
! style="background-color:#E9E9E9;text-align:right;" |Votes
! style="background-color:#E9E9E9;text-align:right;" |%
|-
|style="background-color:"|
|align=left|Lyudmila Zhadanova
|align=left|Independent
|
|46.83%
|-
|style="background-color:"|
|align=left|Yury Yegorov
|align=left|Independent
| -
|10.50%
|-
| colspan="5" style="background-color:#E9E9E9;"|
|- style="font-weight:bold"
| colspan="3" style="text-align:left;" | Total
| 
| 100%
|-
| colspan="5" style="background-color:#E9E9E9;"|
|- style="font-weight:bold"
| colspan="4" |Source:
|
|}

1995

|-
! colspan=2 style="background-color:#E9E9E9;text-align:left;vertical-align:top;" |Candidate
! style="background-color:#E9E9E9;text-align:left;vertical-align:top;" |Party
! style="background-color:#E9E9E9;text-align:right;" |Votes
! style="background-color:#E9E9E9;text-align:right;" |%
|-
|style="background-color:#E98282"|
|align=left|Yekaterina Lakhova
|align=left|Women of Russia
|
|34.43%
|-
|style="background-color:#2998D5"|
|align=left|Leonid Kozhendayev
|align=left|Russian All-People's Movement
|
|18.90%
|-
|style="background-color:#CE1100"|
|align=left|Yury Goryachev
|align=left|My Fatherland
|
|16.75%
|-
|style="background-color:"|
|align=left|Viktor Ilyin
|align=left|Independent
|
|9.02%
|-
|style="background-color:#3A46CE"|
|align=left|Vladimir Povalyayev
|align=left|Democratic Choice of Russia – United Democrats
|
|5.52%
|-
|style="background-color:"|
|align=left|Valery Petrov
|align=left|Liberal Democratic Party
|
|3.06%
|-
|style="background-color:#016436"|
|align=left|Mansur Sayfulov
|align=left|Nur
|
|2.80%
|-
|style="background-color:#000000"|
|colspan=2 |against all
|
|7.22%
|-
| colspan="5" style="background-color:#E9E9E9;"|
|- style="font-weight:bold"
| colspan="3" style="text-align:left;" | Total
| 
| 100%
|-
| colspan="5" style="background-color:#E9E9E9;"|
|- style="font-weight:bold"
| colspan="4" |Source:
|
|}

1999

|-
! colspan=2 style="background-color:#E9E9E9;text-align:left;vertical-align:top;" |Candidate
! style="background-color:#E9E9E9;text-align:left;vertical-align:top;" |Party
! style="background-color:#E9E9E9;text-align:right;" |Votes
! style="background-color:#E9E9E9;text-align:right;" |%
|-
|style="background-color:#3B9EDF"|
|align=left|Anatoly Golubkov
|align=left|Fatherland – All Russia
|
|47.14%
|-
|style="background-color:"|
|align=left|Aleksandr Kruglikov
|align=left|Communist Party
|
|23.97%
|-
|style="background-color:"|
|align=left|Aleksandr Mayer
|align=left|Our Home – Russia
|
|7.15%
|-
|style="background-color:"|
|align=left|Lyudmila Zhadanova
|align=left|Independent
|
|5.87%
|-
|style="background-color:"|
|align=left|Vyacheslav Petrov
|align=left|Liberal Democratic Party
|
|2.88%
|-
|style="background-color:"|
|align=left|Pyotr Serbukov
|align=left|Independent
|
|2.13%
|-
|style="background-color:"|
|align=left|Anatoly Dneprov
|align=left|Independent
|
|0.73%
|-
|style="background-color:#000000"|
|colspan=2 |against all
|
|8.12%
|-
| colspan="5" style="background-color:#E9E9E9;"|
|- style="font-weight:bold"
| colspan="3" style="text-align:left;" | Total
| 
| 100%
|-
| colspan="5" style="background-color:#E9E9E9;"|
|- style="font-weight:bold"
| colspan="4" |Source:
|
|}

2003

|-
! colspan=2 style="background-color:#E9E9E9;text-align:left;vertical-align:top;" |Candidate
! style="background-color:#E9E9E9;text-align:left;vertical-align:top;" |Party
! style="background-color:#E9E9E9;text-align:right;" |Votes
! style="background-color:#E9E9E9;text-align:right;" |%
|-
|style="background-color:"|
|align=left|Valentin Ivanov
|align=left|United Russia
|
|34.11%
|-
|style="background-color: "|
|align=left|Yury Goryachev
|align=left|Rodina
|
|23.23%
|-
|style="background-color:"|
|align=left|Ravil Nasyrov
|align=left|Communist Party
|
|9.57%
|-
|style="background-color:"|
|align=left|Khanyafi Ramazanov
|align=left|Independent
|
|7.38%
|-
|style="background-color:"|
|align=left|Tamara Kharitonova
|align=left|Liberal Democratic Party
|
|5.32%
|-
|style="background-color:"|
|align=left|Vladimir Nikonov
|align=left|Agrarian Party
|
|5.01%
|-
|style="background-color:#000000"|
|colspan=2 |against all
|
|12.78%
|-
| colspan="5" style="background-color:#E9E9E9;"|
|- style="font-weight:bold"
| colspan="3" style="text-align:left;" | Total
| 
| 100%
|-
| colspan="5" style="background-color:#E9E9E9;"|
|- style="font-weight:bold"
| colspan="4" |Source:
|
|}

2016

|-
! colspan=2 style="background-color:#E9E9E9;text-align:left;vertical-align:top;" |Candidate
! style="background-color:#E9E9E9;text-align:left;vertical-align:top;" |Party
! style="background-color:#E9E9E9;text-align:right;" |Votes
! style="background-color:#E9E9E9;text-align:right;" |%
|-
|style="background-color: " |
|align=left|Vladislav Tretyak
|align=left|United Russia
|
|65.62%
|-
|style="background-color:"|
|align=left|Yury Sinelshchikov
|align=left|Communist Party
|
|13.50%
|-
|style="background-color:"|
|align=left|Dmitry Grachev
|align=left|Liberal Democratic Party
|
|9.80%
|-
|style="background-color:"|
|align=left|Aleksey Arkhipov
|align=left|A Just Russia
|
|3.56%
|-
|style="background:"| 
|align=left|Ruslan Ilyasov
|align=left|Party of Growth
|
|2.36%
|-
|style="background-color: "|
|align=left|Aleksandr Bragin
|align=left|People's Freedom Party
|
|1.43%
|-
|style="background:"| 
|align=left|Nikolay Kislitsa
|align=left|Yabloko
|
|1.06%
|-
| colspan="5" style="background-color:#E9E9E9;"|
|- style="font-weight:bold"
| colspan="3" style="text-align:left;" | Total
| 
| 100%
|-
| colspan="5" style="background-color:#E9E9E9;"|
|- style="font-weight:bold"
| colspan="4" |Source:
|
|}

2021

|-
! colspan=2 style="background-color:#E9E9E9;text-align:left;vertical-align:top;" |Candidate
! style="background-color:#E9E9E9;text-align:left;vertical-align:top;" |Party
! style="background-color:#E9E9E9;text-align:right;" |Votes
! style="background-color:#E9E9E9;text-align:right;" |%
|-
|style="background-color: " |
|align=left|Vladislav Tretyak (incumbent)
|align=left|United Russia
|
|47.84%
|-
|style="background-color:"|
|align=left|Airat Gibatdinov
|align=left|Communist Party
|
|19.47%
|-
|style="background:"| 
|align=left|Artyom Titov
|align=left|Communists of Russia
|
|6.50%
|-
|style="background:"| 
|align=left|Margarita Barzhanova
|align=left|A Just Russia — For Truth
|
|6.07%
|-
|style="background-color:"|
|align=left|Sergey Marinin
|align=left|Liberal Democratic Party
|
|4.63%
|-
|style="background-color: " |
|align=left|Svetlana Goreva
|align=left|New People
|
|4.44%
|-
|style="background-color: "|
|align=left|Vladimir Ilyin
|align=left|Party of Pensioners
|
|2.33%
|-
|style="background-color: "|
|align=left|Ildar Gabitov
|align=left|Rodina
|
|1.73%
|-
|style="background-color:"|
|align=left|Andrey Gurin
|align=left|The Greens
|
|1.54%
|-
|style="background:"| 
|align=left|Alyona Zotova
|align=left|Party of Growth
|
|1.26%
|-
|style="background-color: "|
|align=left|Nikolay Klyushenkov
|align=left|Civic Platform
|
|0.50%
|-
| colspan="5" style="background-color:#E9E9E9;"|
|- style="font-weight:bold"
| colspan="3" style="text-align:left;" | Total
| 
| 100%
|-
| colspan="5" style="background-color:#E9E9E9;"|
|- style="font-weight:bold"
| colspan="4" |Source:
|
|}

Notes

References

Russian legislative constituencies
Politics of Ulyanovsk Oblast